Esteribar is a town and municipality located in the province and autonomous community of Navarre, northern Spain. The municipal administrative centre is in Zubiri.

References

External links
 ESTERIBAR in the Bernardo Estornés Lasa - Auñamendi Encyclopedia (Euskomedia Fundazioa) 
 Esteribar Website

Municipalities in Navarre